Colonel Álvaro Pérez Morales (born 26 November 1948) is a retired Cuban official. He was the Cuban Minister of Transportation from 7 March 1997 till 20 June 2003. He replaced minister Senén Casas Regueiro.

External links 
 store.eiu.com
 www.lanuevacuba.com
 perso.dromadaire.com

References 

Living people
1948 births
Transport ministers of Cuba
Communist Party of Cuba politicians